Joseph Capriati, born as Giuseppe Capriati (born 25 July 1987 in Caserta, Italy) is an Italian DJ and music producer.

Musical career
Capriati released his first album under the name Save My Soul in July 2010 with Analytic Trail. 

Capriati released an EP called Congenial Endeavor in collaboration with Adam Beyer that was released on Beyer's label.

In November 2013, Capriati released his second album Self Portrait, on Drumcode. This album was described as a 'beautifully melodic dance-floor body of work' by DJ Mag. In relation to this album there was a documentary made called “Autoritratto” which was recorded in Caserta, his hometown, in February 2013. 

In 2016, Capriati announced the launch of his own label, Redimension. On the 20th of June of that same year he released two tracks - "Parallels" and "External Links" - in collaboration with Beyer. Almost a year after, in March 2017, he released a second project "Prospective Journeys", in collaboration with Flavio Folco.

On September 4, 2020, the Neapolitan artist published his third album, Metamorfosi.

On January 9, 2021, Joseph Capriati was hospitalized after his father stabbed him during a heated argument that got out of control.

Discography

LPs 

 2010 - Save My Soul - Analytic Trail
 2013 - Self Portrait - Drumcode
 2015 - Fabric 80: Joseph Capriati - Fabric
 2020 - Metamorfosi - Redimension Music

EPs 

 2007 - Formaldehyde EP (feat. Sasha Carassi) - Globox
 2007 - Teoria Della Fissione EP (feat. Sasha Carassi) - Capsula
 2007 – Flip Da Box EP – Globox
 2007 – Loving My Parents EP: Sirgardino – Vito (Joseph Capriati RMX) – Subtronic
 2007 – Weekend EP – Minibus
 2007 – C’est la Vie EP – Analytic Trail
 2007 – Elastico (feat. Sasha Carassi) – Tracks 4 Djs 
 2007 – Colander EP - Tracks 4 Djs
 2008 – Russian EP: Tessa N Calveri – Russian – (Joseph Capriati RMX) – Cromate Recordings
 2008 – Giallo Canarino (feat. Matteo Spedicati) – CMYK Music
 2008 - At Last EP (feat. Abnormal Boyz) - Split Sound Records
 2008 - Luca Albano - Subruban (Joseph Capriati RMX) - Stereo Seven Productions
 2008 - Orange EP (feat. Rino Cerrone) - Loose Records
 2008 - Round Zero (feat. Markantonio) - MKT Rec
 2008 - Things that work EP - Agile Recordings
 2008 - Farlocco EP - Frankie Records
 2008 - Unrilis002 (feat. Rino Cerrone) - Unrilis 
 2008 - Molotov EP (feat. Markantonio) - Analytic Train
 2009 - Codice Morse EP (feat. Markantonio) - Alchemy
 2008 - Koala: Koala (Joseph Capriati Mix) - MB Elektronics
 2008 - Stealth EP: Simone Tavazzi - Stealth (Joseph Capriati RMX) - Syndikaat Records
2008 - Best Of 2008 - Minimal Edition: Russian (Joseph Capriati RMX) - Gastspiel Records
 2008 - Rilis Remixes Series Vol.4: Rino Cerrone - Burn it (Joseph Capriati RMX) - Unrilis
 2008 - Mixed Bag EP: Joaquin Drama - Baglama (Joseph Capriati RMX) - Frankie Records
 2009 - Login EP 1.0 - CLR
 2009 - Login EP 2.0 - CLR
 2009 - Angels over Naples EP: Roboters (Original Mix) - Sci + Tech
 2010 - Gashouder EP - Drumcode

References

People from Caserta
1987 births
Italian DJs
Italian house musicians
Italian electronic musicians
Living people
Electronic dance music DJs